Eduard Arkadevich Steinberg (3 March 1937 – 28 March 2012) was a Russian painter, philosopher and activist.

Personal life
Steinberg was born in Moscow, the son of poet, translator and artist . He had residences in Tarusa (Kaluga region) and Paris. His wife, Galina Iosifovna Manevich, is a Russian art critic, author and essayist.

Career
Steinberg began his career drawing live models and landscapes and later switched to "metaphysical still lifes".

In the 1960–1980s Steinberg participated in the dissident movement in the USSR, which supported freedom of expression in arts and basic human rights.

Steinberg became Honorary Members of the Russian Academy of Arts. Taking from the hands of Zurab Tsereteli a medal on a red ribbon, Steinberg said: 

He also was Chevalier of the Order of Friendship (2008).

Steinberg died at his home in Paris from pneumonia on 28 March 2012.

Selected exhibitions
 1992 : , Josef-Albers-Museum in Bottrop, Germany 
 1995 : , Bochum, Germany
 1999 : Morsbroich Museum, Leverkusen
 2000 : , Ludwigshafen 
 2004 :  State Russian Museum, Saint Petersburg
 2005 : «Eduard Steinberg, Das Leben eines Dreiecks (Gouachen und Gemälde) 1970-2004», Galerie Sandmann, Berlin
 2005 : «Russia!» — Solomon R. Guggenheim Museum, New York 
 2009 : Edik Steinberg at Gallery Claude Bernard, Paris (14 May - 27 June 2009) 
 2011—2012 : «Passion Bild», Kunstmuseum Bern
 2012 : Religiöse Motive in der inoffiziellen Kunst der Sowjetunion

References

External links 
 Eduard Steinberg on the Tsukanov Art Collection site
 Painter Eduard Steinberg working, VIDEO by G. Bastianelli, 5 min. 40 sec.
 Artist's Biography, Museum references, 133 Auction records on the AskArt 
 Eduard Steinberg on the ArtOfTheRussias
 
 Bilder von Eduard Steinberg
 Eduard Steinberg profile at artfacts.net

20th-century Russian painters
Russian male painters
21st-century Russian painters
Abstract painters
1937 births
2012 deaths
Honorary Members of the Russian Academy of Arts
Russian contemporary artists
20th-century Russian male artists
21st-century Russian male artists